Tina Mabry (born February 9, 1978) is an American film director and screenwriter from Tupelo, Mississippi. Following the release of her first feature film Mississippi Damned (2009), she was named one of '25 New Faces of Indie Film' by Filmmaker magazine and among the 'Top Forty Under 40' by The Advocate. Mabry was named a James Baldwin Fellow in Media by United States Artists.

Early life
Tina Mabry was born in Tupelo, Mississippi, in 1978. After seeing Kimberly Peirce's Boys Don't Cry and Gina Prince-Bythewood's Love & Basketball while an undergrad at the University of Mississippi, she determined she had to go into film and moved to Los Angeles. She received her Masters of Fine Arts in Cinema and Television from the University of Southern California.

Career
Mabry began her film career with her short film Brooklyn's Bridge to Jordan (2005). In 2007, she penned the film Itty Bitty Titty Committee. The film was directed by Jamie Babbit and premiered at the 57th Berlin International Film Festival.

Mabry made her feature film directing debut in 2009 with Mississippi Damned, which she also wrote and acknowledges draws from aspects of her own life. She received a film stock grant from Kodak, which enabled her to film it. The film was successful on the festival circuit, winning top prizes at the Chicago International Film Festival, Outfest, American Black Film Festival, and Urbanworld Film Festival. It premiered on Showtime in 2011 and is currently streaming on Netflix courtesy of Ava DuVernay's ARRAY.

Mabry has written and directed two episodes of FutureStates produced by ITVS, including Ant starring Guillermo Díaz.

In 2015, Mabry was hired as a producer, writer, and director on the OWN series Queen Sugar, created by Ava DuVernay and Oprah Winfrey.

Personal life

See also
 List of female film and television directors
 List of lesbian filmmakers
 List of LGBT-related films directed by women

References

External links
 
 

 "Interview With “Mississippi Damned” Filmmakers Tina Mabry and Morgan Stiff",  Afterellen.com 
 "The Preponderance of Flatscreen TVs Doesn't Mean LGBT Characters of Color Have to Flatline", The Huffington Post

1978 births
Living people
American film directors
American film producers
American television directors
American women film directors
American women film producers
American women screenwriters
African-American film directors
African-American film producers
African-American screenwriters
African-American television directors
English-language film directors
LGBT film directors
LGBT producers
American LGBT screenwriters
American women television directors
American women television writers
American television writers
21st-century African-American people
LGBT television directors
21st-century African-American women
20th-century African-American people
20th-century African-American women
African-American women writers